Urdz was a district and family of the old Armenia c. 400–800. The district was in Siunik, region of Balk.

The ruler about 451 was Narseh Urdzi.

See also
List of regions of old Armenia

Early medieval Armenian regions